Mount Watson is a 12,497-foot (3,809 meter) glaciated mountain summit located in the Fairweather Range of the Saint Elias Mountains, in southeast Alaska, United States. It ranks as the fifth-highest peak in the Fairweather Range. The mountain's name was officially adopted by the United States Board on Geographic Names in 1924 to commemorate David Thompson Watson (1844-1916), who was US Counsel to the 1903 Alaska Boundary Tribunal. The first ascent of the peak was made June 18, 1974, by Michael Allen, Walter Gove, Lawrence Dauelsberg, Alice Liska, and Donald Liska via the East Ridge. The first ascent of the North Face was made in April 1999 by Chris Trimble and Jim Earl. The months May through June offer the most favorable weather for climbing.

Climate

Based on the Köppen climate classification, Mount Watson has a subarctic climate with cold, snowy winters, and mild summers. Temperatures can drop below −20 °C with wind chill factors below −30 °C. This climate supports hanging glaciers on its slopes as well as the large Grand Plateau Glacier to the west. Precipitation runoff and meltwater from its glaciers drains into the Gulf of Alaska.

See also

Geography of Alaska
Geography of British Columbia

References

External links
 Weather forecast: Mount Watson

Watson
Watson
Watson
Watson
Watson